Piret Raud (born 15 July 1971) is a contemporary Estonian author and illustrator.

Biography
Piret Raud was born 15 July 1971. She is the daughter of Estonian children's authors Eno Raud and Aino Pervik. Her brothers are scholar and author Rein Raud and musician and writer Mihkel Raud.

She graduated from the Estonian Academy of Arts in printmaking, and initially set off on the same path.

After trying her hand at writing, Raud has since become the most renowned and widely translated children's author in Estonia. She has written about 20 titles, has been translated into 14 different languages, and has illustrated more than 50 titles.

Since 2018, she has mainly been writing for older audiences. To date, Raud has published 3 novels and a short story collection. Her fiction has been well received: she has received the A. H. Tammsaare Literary Award (2020) for her novel Verihurmade aed (The Garden of Devil's Milks), been nominated for the Estonian Cultural Endowment Annual Award for Literature (2021) for Kaotatud sõrmed (Lost Fingers) and most recently won the prestigious Friedebert Tuglas Short Story Award (2022) for her short story Pink (The Bench).

Selected works
Fiction

 Initsiaal purjeka ja papagoiga (The Initial with Ship and Parakeet), Tänapäev, 2018 (novel)
 Verihurmade aed (The Garden of Devil's Milks), Tänapäev, 2019 (novel)
 Kaotatud sõrmed (Lost Fingers), Tänapäev, 2020 (short story collection)
 Portselanist Nael (The Porcelain Nail), Tänapäev, 2021 (novel)
 Nimepanija (The Namer), Tänapäev, 2022 (short story collection)

Children's books
Kataleena isemoodi juuksed (Kataleena's Peculiar Hair), Sinisukk 1995
Ernesto küülikud (Ernesto's Rabbits), Tänapäev 2004
Sanna ja salakütid (Sanna and the Poachers), Tänapäev 2005
Printsess Luluu ja härra Kere (Princess Lulu and Mr. Bones), Tänapäev 2008
Härra Linnu lugu (Mister Bird's Story), Tammerraamat 2009
Tobias ja teine B (Tobias, Second Grade), Mustvalge 2010
Emma roosad asjad (Emma Loves Pink), Tammerraamat 2010 + digital book in English, Japanese and Estonian for iPad, iPhone and iPod Touch, 2010
Natuke napakad lood (Slightly Silly Stories), Tänapäev 2012
Kolm soovi (Three Wishes), Tänapäev 2012
Teistmoodi printsessilood (Princesses with a Twist), Tänapäev 2013
Roosi tahab lennata (Rosie Wants to Fly), Mustvalge Kirjastus 2013
Mina, emme ja meie igasugused sõbrad (Me, Mum, and Our Friends of All Sorts), Tänapäev 2014
Lugu Sandrist, Murist, tillukesest emmest ja nähtamatust Akslist (The Story of Sander, Muri, the Eensy Mum, and the Invisible Aksel), Tänapäev 2015
Kõik võiks olla roosa! (Everything Could Be Pink!), Tammerraamat 2015
Emili ja oi kui palju asju (Emily and a Whole Bunch of Things), Tänapäev 2015
Trööömmmpffff ehk Eli hääl (Trööömmmpffff, or Eli's Voice), Tänapäev 2016
Kõik minu sugulased (All My Relatives), Tänapäev 2017
Lugu väikesest majast, kes tahtis olla kodu (The Story of the Little House Who Wanted to Be a Home), Tänapäev 2018
Kõrv (The Ear), Tänapäev 2019

Translations
Albanian
Princeshat e Estonisë, Shkupi 2015

English
Mister Bird's Story, Tammerraamat 2009
The Ear, Thames & Hudson 2019

French
Monsieur Oiseau veut changer de peau, Éditions Le Pommier 2012
Sa majesté Ver-de-Terre et autres folles princesses, Rouergue 2013
Le thé des poisons et autres histoires, Rouergue 2013
Princesse Lulu et Monsieur Nonosse, Rouergue 2014
Emily et tout un tas de choses, Rouergue 2015
Voisins zinzins et autres histoires de mon immeuble, Rouergue 2015
Trööömmmpffff ou la voix d’Elie, Rouergue 2016
Au secours! Maman rétrécit, Rouergue 2017
L’histoire de la petite maison qui recherchait des habitants, Rouergue 2017

German
Die Geschichte vom Herrn Vogel, Leiv 2010

Hungarian
Tóbiás és a 2/b, Pongrác Kiadó 2014

Italian
Voglio tutto rosa, Sinnos 2014
La principessa e lo scheletro, Sinnos 2015
Micromamma, Sinnos 2018
Trööömmmpffff o la voce di Eli, EDB Edizioni Dehoniane 2018
Emily e un mare di cose, EDB Edizioni Dehoniane 2019

Japanese
みっつのねがい, Fukuinkan Shoten Publishers 2012
ピンクだいすき!, Fukuinkan Shoten Publishers 2014

Korean

 엄마가 작아졌어요, Better Books 2019

Latvian

Princess Skella un Leta kungs, Liels un mazs 2011
Berts un otrā B, Liels un mazs 2013
Princese pa pastu, Liels un mazs 2016

Lithuanian
Pono Paukščio istorija, Sofoklis 2013
Princesė Lulu ir ponas Skeletonas, Dominicus Lituanus 2015
Šiek tiek paikos istorijos, 700 eilučių 2018

Polish
Księżniczki nieco zakręcone, Finebooks 2015
Historie trochę szalone, Finebooks 2015
Ja, mama i nasi zwariowani przyjaciele, Finebooks 2019

Russian
Эрнесто и его кролики, Aleksandra 2012
Чудные истории, Aleksandra 2014
Тобиас и второй "Б", Koolibri 2018

Slovenian

 Prismuknjene zgodbe, Sodobnost 2019

Spanish

La curiosa historia del senor Pajaro, Libros del Zorro Rojo 2011

Awards and honors

 2004: Children's Story competition "My First Book", 1st place (Ernesto's Rabbits)
 2005: Annual Children's Literature Award of the Cultural Endowment of Estonia (Sanna and the Poachers)
 2008: Annual Children's Literature Award of the Cultural Endowment of Estonia (Princess Lulu and Mr. Bones)
 2009: Estonian Children's Literature Centre Raisin of the Year Award (Mister Bird's Story)
 2010: The White Ravens (Mister Bird's Story)
 2011: Children's and Young Adult Jury (Bērnu un jauniešu žūrija), Latvia, 1st place (Grades 3–4) (Princess Lulu and Mr. Bones)
 2012: IBBY Honour List (Princess Lulu and Mr. Bones)
 2013: The White Ravens (Three Wishes)
 2014: "Järje Hoidja" Award of the Tallinn Central Library (Princesses with a Twist)
 2015: Lire ici et là (Slightly Silly Stories)
 2015: Annual Children's Literature Award of the Cultural Endowment of Estonia (The Story of Sander, Muri, Eensy Mum, and the Invisible Aksel)
 2016: Hans Christian Andersen Award nominee
 2016: Order of the White Star, IV Class
 2014–2017: Astrid Lindgren Memorial Award candidate
2020 A. H. Tammsaare Literary Award (The Garden of Devil's Milks)
2021 Shortlisted for the Cultural Endowment Annual Award for Literature, Best Book of Fiction (Lost Fingers)
2022 Friedebert Tuglas short story award (The Bench)

References

External links 
 Piret Raud: Don’t fear the more serious and mature children’s books. An interview by Eva and Indrek Koff in Estonian Literary Magazine 1/2016

1971 births
Living people
Estonian children's writers
Estonian children's book illustrators
Estonian translators
Estonian women illustrators
Estonian women children's writers
Recipients of the Order of the White Star, 4th Class
Writers from Tallinn
Artists from Tallinn
21st-century Estonian women writers
21st-century translators